The North and Central American (NACAM) Formula 4 Championship is a formula racing series run to FIA Formula 4 regulations. The inaugural season was held over 2015 and 2016.

History
Gerhard Berger and the FIA Singleseater Commission launched Formula 4 in March 2013. The goal of the Formula 4 was to make the ladder to Formula 1 more transparent. Besides sporting and technical regulations, costs are also regulated. A car to compete in this category may not exceed €30'000 and a single season in Formula 4 may not exceed €100'000. NACAM Formula 4 was the last series to start in 2015 and the eighth Formula 4 category overall.

Alexandra Mohnhaupt made history in 2018 as the first female driver to win a race to Formula 4 regulations, the Mexican driver winning the first and second races at the fourth round of the 2017–18 season.

Car

The NACAM Formula 4 car is similar to the cars used in Australia and the United Kingdom utilising Mygale monocoque and carbon fibre frames running Ford 1.6L EcoBoost engines.

Champions

Drivers

Rookie Cup

Nations Cup

Circuits 

 Bold denotes a circuit will be used in the 2023 season.

Notes

References

External links
 

 
Formula racing series
Recurring sporting events established in 2015
Formula 4 series
Auto racing series in Mexico